Arthur Wesley Van Horn (15 March 1860-18 April 1931) was a prolific architect of Bismarck, North Dakota.  
A number of Van Horn's works, alone or as part of his firm (Ritterbush Brothers), are listed on the U.S. National Register of Historic Places.

Biography
Arthur Van Horn was born at Hackensack, in Bergen County, New Jersey. His parents were Cornelius J. and Almira Van Saun. He worked and studied in New York City, where he attended  The Cooper Union for the Advancement of Science and Art and received private instruction in the study of architecture. He moved to Bismarck and  began as an independent architect in 1883. He worked with Karl A. Loven in  Van Horn & Loven during 1917–1919, and with Robert A. Ritterbush and Clarence W. Ritterbush in Van Horn & Ritterbush Brothers during 1920–1931.  The Bismarck-based firm evolved as Ritterbush Brothers during 1931–1974 and subsequently as Ritterbush Associates.

Notable works
 Henry J. Geierman house, 100 W Ave A, Bismarck, North Dakota (1908)
 Bismarck Civic Auditorium, 201 N 6th St, Bismarck, North Dakota (1913–14, NRHP 1976)
 Frank E. Shepard house, 226 W Ave B, Bismarck, North Dakota (1916)
 Van Horn Hotel, 114 N 3rd St, Bismarck, North Dakota (1916 and 1926, NRHP 1984)
 Hughes Auto Building, 123 E Broadway Ave, Bismarck, North Dakota (1920)
 Olympia Building, 305 E Broadway Ave, Bismarck, North Dakota (1920)
 Logan County Courthouse, 301 Broadway, Napoleon, North Dakota (1921 and 1924, NRHP 1985)
 Willows Hotel, 112 S Broadway, Linton, North Dakota (1922, NRHP 1996)
 Dakota Hall, North Dakota Youth Correctional Center, Mandan, North Dakota (1924–25, demolished circa 1996)
 Devine Hall, North Dakota Youth Correctional Center, Mandan, North Dakota (1928–29)
 Capital Chevrolet building, 101 E Broadway Ave, Bismarck, North Dakota (1929)
 Universal Motor Company building, 122 N 1st St, Bismarck, North Dakota (1930)

See also
 Van Horn-Ritterbush Architecture Records, State Historical Society of North Dakota.
 Arthur W. Van Horn (1927) Van Horn Family of Bergen County, New Jersey, 1657-1927 (A.W. Van Horn)

Notes

References

Architects from New Jersey
Architects from North Dakota
People from Bismarck, North Dakota
1860 births
1931 deaths
People from Hackensack, New Jersey
Cooper Union alumni
American people of Dutch descent
19th-century American architects
20th-century American architects